The 2011 The Citadel Bulldogs football team represented The Citadel, The Military College of South Carolina in the 2011 NCAA Division I FCS football season. The Bulldogs were led by seventh year head coach Kevin Higgins and played their home games at Johnson Hagood Stadium. They are a member of the Southern Conference. They finished the season 4–7, 2–6 in SoCon play to finish in eighth place.

Preseason
The Bulldogs returned a total of 22 starters from last year's team, losing only 6 players.  On offense, ten starters returned, while eight return on defense and four on special teams.  SoCon coaches picked The Citadel to finish eight in the conference, ahead of only Western Carolina.  Media covering the conference picked The Citadel to finish last.  Only one Bulldog was picked to the preseason All-Conference team, with senior LB Tolu Akindele on the second team.

Schedule

Awards
After placing only one player on the preseason team, the Bulldogs placed four players on the postseason All Conference teams, along with two on the All Freshman team.

Season
Derek Douglas, DL - 1st Team All Conference (Coaches and Media)
Cass Couey, P - 1st Team All Conference (Coaches and Media)
Mike Sellers, OL - 1st Team All Conference (Coaches), 2nd Team All Conference (Media)
Chris Billingslea - 2nd Team All Conference (Coaches and Media)
Aaron Miller - All Freshman (Coaches)
Rah Muhammad - All Freshman (Coaches)

Weekly
Rob Harland (LB) - SoCon Defensive Player of the Week, week 5

Game summaries

Jacksonville

Furman

Elon

Chattanooga

The Citadel trailed 27-0 in the third quarter before rallying to score four touchdowns, taking a 28–27 lead.  DB Davis Boyle intercepted a pass from B.J. Coleman in the final minutes to seal the upset over #15 Chattanooga.

Wofford

Appalachian State

Western Carolina

VMI

In the first Military Classic of the South since 2007, The Citadel defeated VMI 41–14.  The Bulldogs blocked three Keydet punts, returning one for a touchdown.  The Citadel rushed for 358 yards and four offensive touchdowns, with two each by QB Ben Dupree and RB Denard Robinson.  VMI's passing game was largely held in check with only 68 yards in the air, although RB Chaz Jones carried 16 times for 112 yards and a touchdown.  The Citadel now leads the series 35–30–2, winning each of the last five meetings.  The Citadel also holds a 22–10 record when meeting VMI in Charleston.

The Citadel and VMI agreed to renew their series for six years beginning in 2011, alternating home fields.  The series dates to 1920, and they have played every year since 1946, with the exception of 1956, 2004, and 2008–2010.

Georgia Southern

The Bulldogs had two extra points blocked and a missed field goal with 12 seconds remaining as Georgia Southern held on for a 14–12 win.

Samford

South Carolina

NFL Draft selection

References

Citadel
The Citadel Bulldogs football seasons
Citadel football